Andrew Welsh (born 11 February 1983) is a former Australian rules footballer in the Australian Football League.

He was a backline player who played halfback or back pocket for much of his career. However, later in his career he developed his game to play as a tagging-defensive midfielder.

He was a very quick player and runs off half back very well. A knee injury in 2005 sidetracked his career a little, but made a strong comeback in defence during 2006. In 2007 and 2008 his role changed, and he played primarily as a defensive forward and defensive midfielder respectively.

In October 2011, Welsh retired from Essendon Football Club due to several injury setbacks after playing 162 games with the club.

He then moved to the United States to attempt to become an actor. In 2013, he became a boundary rider for the Seven Network.

Statistics
 Statistics are correct as of Round 22, 2011 (1 October 2011)

References

External links

1983 births
Essendon Football Club players
Living people
Australian rules footballers from Melbourne
Calder Cannons players
Bendigo Football Club players